The 2012 World Junior Championships in Athletics was an international athletics competition for athletes qualifying as juniors (born 1993 or later) which was held at the Estadi Olímpic Lluís Companys in Barcelona, Catalonia, Spain, on 10–15 July 2012. A total of 44 athletics events were contested at the championships, 22 by male and 22 by female athletes.

Several medalists from the 2010 championships were eligible to defend their titles, including Jacko Gill, Jodie Williams, Shaunae Miller, and Angelica Bengtsson.  Gill and Bengtsson were successful.

Men's results

Track

Field

Women's results

Track

Field

Medal table

Participation
According to an unofficial count through an unofficial result list, 1566 athletes from 171 countries participated in the event.  This is in agreement with the official numbers as published.

References

External links 
 Official results

 
World Athletics U20 Championships
World Junior Championships
Athletics competitions in Catalonia
Sports competitions in Barcelona
2012 in Spanish sport
International sports competitions hosted by Catalonia
Athletics in Barcelona